The Party of Algerian Renewal (Parti du Renouveau Algérien) is a minor liberal political party in Algeria.

History and profile
The Party of Algerian Renewal was established in 1989. Noureddine Boukrou is the founder of the party.

In the 2002 elections it received 0.3% of the vote and had one member of parliament.  In the 17 May 2007 People's National Assembly elections, the party won 1.80% of the vote and 4 out of 389 seats.

References

1989 establishments in Algeria
Liberal parties in Algeria
Political parties established in 1989
Political parties in Algeria